Group D of the 1995 Fed Cup Europe/Africa Zone Group II was one of four pools in the Europe/Africa Zone Group II of the 1995 Fed Cup. Five teams competed in a round robin competition, with the top two teams advancing to the play-offs.

Ireland vs. Cyprus

Yugoslavia vs. Kenya

Ireland vs. Kenya

Yugoslavia vs. Malta

Yugoslavia vs. Cyprus

Malta vs. Kenya

Ireland vs. Yugoslavia

Malta vs. Cyprus

Ireland vs. Malta

Kenya vs. Cyprus

See also
Fed Cup structure

References

External links
 Fed Cup website

1995 Fed Cup Europe/Africa Zone